USTS Empire State VI (T-AP-1001), callsign KKFW, IMO number 5264510, was a troop ship of the United States Navy and training vessel of the United States Maritime Service.

Construction and early years
Empire State VI was originally built for States Steamship Company in Newport News, Virginia at Newport News Shipbuilding and Drydock Company as a MARAD Type C4-S-1u break bulk cargo freighter. She was delivered to the States Line on 19 April 1962 as the SS Oregon, a name she kept until the vessel was purchased February 15, 1977 by Moore McCormack Lines who renamed the vessel Mormactide. She went to United States Lines in 1983 when USL purchased MML.  Although not the last private owner of the vessel, Moore McCormack Lines was the last company to operate Empire State before being entered into government service, as USL only operated container ships.

Government service
In 1986 the last private owner of the vessel, United States Lines, went bankrupt and turned over Mormactide to the Federal Government's Maritime Administration (MARAD).  She was originally designated to be converted to an ammunition ship, USNS Cape Junction (T-AK-507?).  Meanwhile, the vessel was laid up in the James River, National Defense Reserve Fleet, Fort Eustis, Virginia.  In 1988 Mormactide was taken to Sturgeon Bay, Wisconsin, and underwent a conversion to a Training Ship at Bay Shipbuilding Corporation.  After the conversion Mormactide was renamed Empire State VI. She was delivered to the State University of New York Maritime College at Fort Schuyler  on New Year's Eve in 1989 to replace the older Empire State V.

In 1994 Empire State VI was activated by MARAD to support the withdrawal of American troops from Mogadishu, Somalia.  In the 2005 aftermath of Hurricane Katrina and Hurricane Rita which devastated the Gulf Coast, MARAD again activated Empire State VI.  The vessel provided housing and support for port workers and petroleum industry workers as they began repairs on strategic infrastructure and facilities in Louisiana.

In the fall of 2012, after Hurricane Sandy struck the New York/New Jersey area, the college offered the vessel to billet AmeriCorps - Federal Emergency Management Agency (FEMA) Corps and FEMA workers, from outside the region.
 and TS Kennedy were also used to house FEMA workers, and between them the three ships housed 1,200 workers.

In September 2017, following the impact of Hurricane Harvey on the Gulf Coast of the United States, MARAD again activated the ship in order to provide support for FEMA's operations in Texas.  However, after subsequent hurricanes made landfall in Florida and Puerto Rico the vessel was diverted to provide relief in the ports of Key West and San Juan, while in San Juan, the ship provided housing and meals to FEMA workers.

Empire State left the maritime college for the final time on 5 October 2022.  She arrived at the port of Brownsville, Texas on 27 November 2022 and was stricken from the National Defense Reserve Fleet.

Training voyage

Each summer Empire State VI was activated for a 100-day training voyage. Students in the Regiment of Cadets operated the vessel for a summer sea term as part of their training requirements.  The vessel's 2022 voyage, her last, ended on 2 August. The ship was retired after a 60-year service career.

The ship held the record as the longest serving power-driven vessel ever used by the school.  While in very good condition given her age, she retained a steam power plant, despite diesel power having been the industry standard for decades.  Her emissions also exceed international standards, and this has affected her training itineraries. In 2015 a Congressional committee examined the cost of replacing the vessels of the six maritime academies where the average vessel age was 35 years, and Empire State was the oldest at 60 years. In March 2018 the US federal budget included funding to replace the aging training vessels with a National Security Multi-Mission Vessel design.  The first vessel built was expected to replace Empire State in 2022 but delivery was delayed to 2023.

References

External links
 A list of Sealift Command ships

Transports of the United States Navy
Training ships of the New York State Merchant Marine Academy
Training ships of the United States
1961 ships
Ships built in Newport News, Virginia